Hanan Keren, also written Chanan Keren (חנן קרן; born September 2, 1952), is an Israeli former basketball player. He played the guard position. He played in the Israel Basketball Premier League, and for the Israeli national basketball team.

Biography

Keren was born in Israel. He is 1.91 m (6 ft 3 in) tall.

He played in the Israel Basketball Premier League, and averaged 16.1 points per game in his career. Keren played for Maccabi Tel Aviv, Hapoel Ramat Gan, and 
Kiryat Motzkin.

Keren also played for the Israeli national basketball team in the 
1971 European Championship for Men, 1972 Pre-Olympic Basketball Tournament, 
1973 European Championship for Men, 1975 European Championship for Men, and  1977 European Championship for Men.

References 

Living people
1952 births
Israeli men's basketball players
Maccabi Tel Aviv B.C. players
Israeli Basketball Premier League players
Basketball players at the 1970 Asian Games
Basketball players at the 1974 Asian Games
Medalists at the 1970 Asian Games
Medalists at the 1974 Asian Games
Asian Games medalists in basketball
Asian Games gold medalists for Israel
Asian Games silver medalists for Israel